Presidential elections were held in the Maldives on 30 September 1983. Maumoon Abdul Gayoom was the sole candidate nominated by Parliament. His candidacy was approved by 95.6% of voters.

Results

References

Maldives
1983 in the Maldives
Presidential elections in the Maldives
Single-candidate elections
September 1983 events in Asia
Election and referendum articles with incomplete results